Gymnochaetopsis is a genus of parasitic flies in the family Tachinidae. There are at least two described species in Gymnochaetopsis.

Species
These two species belong to the genus Gymnochaetopsis:
 Gymnochaetopsis analis Townsend, 1914
 Gymnochaetopsis fulvicauda (Walton, 1914)

References

Further reading

 
 
 
 

Tachinidae
Articles created by Qbugbot